Metric Structures for Riemannian and Non-Riemannian Spaces is a book in geometry by Mikhail Gromov. It was originally published in French in 1981 under the title Structures métriques pour les variétés riemanniennes, by CEDIC (Paris).

History
The 1981 edition was edited by Jacques Lafontaine and Pierre Pansu. The English version, considerably expanded, was published in 1999 by Birkhäuser Verlag, with appendices by Pierre Pansu, Stephen Semmes, and Mikhail Katz. The book was well received and has been reprinted several times.

References 

Riemannian geometry
Mathematics books
Systolic geometry
Birkhäuser books